Collo was an ancient Roman– a city of the Ottoman empire and Berber. Located in the northern Skikda Province, Algeria. It was the capital and one of three municipalities of Collo District, and a Catholic titular episcopal see under its Roman name Chullu. In 1998, it had a population of 27,800.

History 
In Roman times, Collo was a city in the province of Numidia, called Chullu. At the joint Conference of Carthage (411) that brought together Catholic and Donatist bishops of Roman Africa, Chullu was represented by the Catholic bishop Victor and the Donatist Fidentius.

In 1282, king Peter III of Aragon led an expedition to Collo, in proclaimed support of a rebellion against the ruler of Tunis. The rebellion had collapsed before Peter arrived, but he kept his army there for several weeks until, in the wake of the Sicilian Vespers, envoys from Sicily came to Collo to offer him its throne. The resulting war continued until 1301.

Geography
The city is distinguished by its containing of a mountain range, the most prominent of which are el Goufi , Sidi Achour , and the Tars Mountains. It is known for its various beaches and tourist attractions.

Climate 
Collo's climate is classified as warm and temperate. The rain falls mostly in the winter, with relatively little rain in the summer. According to the Köppen Climate Classification system, this climate is classified as "Csa".

Demographics

Titular bishopric 
In 1833, the Roman diocese was nominally revived as a titular see of the lowest (episcopal) rank. 
So far, it had four incumbents:
 Marc Lacroix, O.M.I. (1968.10.25 – 1970.11.24)
 Joseph Edra Ukpo (later Archbishop) (1971.04.24 – 1973.03.01)
 Franco Mulakkal (2009.01.17 – 2013.06.13)
 Varghese Thottamkara, Lazarists (C.M.) (2013.06.28 – present)

See also 

European enclaves in North Africa before 1830

References

Sources and external links

 GigaCatholic, with titular bishops list and linked biographies

Chullu
Chullu
Communes of Skikda Province
Skikda Province